Lyophyllum shimeji, commonly known as the hon-shimeji is an edible species of fungus in the family Lyophyllaceae that grows in pine forests, often near man-made roads. It is found in Japan, Sweden, Finland and Estonia.

Ecology
Lyophyllum shimeji grows in pine forests.

Edibility
This species is considered edible.

Similar species
Lyophyllum shimeji is similar in appearance to the edible species Lyophyllum decastes and toxic species Lyophyllum loricatum, Lyophyllum connatum, Clitocybe dilatata, and those of the Entoloma genus are also similar in appearance.

References

Lyophyllaceae
Fungi described in 1971
Fungi of Japan